The 18th Orgburo of the All-Union Communist Party (Bolsheviks) was elected by the 1st Plenary Session of the  18th Central Committee, in the immediate aftermath of the 18th Congress. It was the last Orgburo, as its functions were transferred to an enlarged Secretariat at the 19th Congress before the Orgburo itself was abolished.

Full members

References

Members of the Orgburo of the Central Committee of the Communist Party of the Soviet Union
1939 establishments in the Soviet Union
1952 disestablishments in the Soviet Union